Snow Lake Water Aerodrome  is located adjacent to Snow Lake, Manitoba, Canada.

See also
Snow Lake Airport

References

Registered aerodromes in Manitoba
Seaplane bases in Manitoba